Ramkrishna Mukherjee (14 November 1917 – 15 November 2015) was a scientist at the Indian Statistical Institute, Kolkata, President of the Indian Sociological Society (1973–75) and recipient of the Indian Sociological Society's Lifetime Achievement Award in 2005.

He is particularly well known for his study Dynamics of a Rural Society and his dialectical method in dealing with the study of Indian society.

Early life and education
He was born to a middle-class family in Kolkata, India, his father Satindra Nath being an engineer in the Indian Railways. He obtained  MSc degree in 1941 from University of Calcutta and a PhD in 1948 from the University of Cambridge, United Kingdom. From 1941 to 1944 he was an activist in the Peasant movement. Although he specialized in human genetics, he  took lessons in statistics from Prasanta Chandra Mahalanobis, founder of the ISI.

Career
In 1948 and 1949 he was Chief Research Officer to His Majesty's Social Survey, London and had been Consultant to Government of Turkey in 1949 and Consultant to the London School of Economics in 1952. He began his career as a Professor at the Institute of Indian Studies at Humboldt University of Berlin in Germany from 1953 to 1957. He  was adjunct professor at Binghamton University in the United States from 1977 to 1989. He spent most of his professional life with the Indian Statistical Institute from 1944 until his retirement in 1979.

Work
Along with DP Mukerji, he established the All India Sociological Conference (AISC). He worked as adviser for social science institutions and journals  in India and abroad. With his work the theme of agrarian social structure and change was to re-appear in Indian Sociology only after a gap of nearly two decades in the late 1960s and 1970s. Among Indian sociologists, he stressed the importance of a dialectic model for the study of Indian society and made systematic as well as empirical studies using this model. This  is exemplified by his  book  Rise and Fall of East India Company (1958) which is a contribution to economic and social history of the institutionalization of colonialism in India . He tried to develop an inductive methodology for social sciences. His  research interests included genetics, studies in classification of families, rural society, historical sociology, problems of acculturation and Social Indicators Research besides which he contributed over  subjects like family, caste and class, agrarian relations in West Bengal, nationalism in Bangladesh, urbanization and social change and colonial exploitation by the East India Company and in Uganda, and also contributed towards designing of National Sample Surveys. He had a Marxian and historical perspective  with which he studied  social institutions such as family and caste.

Awards and honors
Asiatic Society Gold Medal for Anthropology (1981)
National Fellow, Indian Council of Social Science Research from 1992 to 1994
   Swami Pranavanand Education Award for Sociology by University Grants Commission| New Delhi,(1985)
 by Government of Madhya Pradesh
 Member-Executive Committee, International Sociological Association| (ISA) (1976)

Personal life
Mukherjee married Prabhati Mukherjee, an academician, who died in 2008. They had two daughters, both of whom entered the academic field.

Selected publications

Books

Felicitation volumes

Selected journal articles

References

Further reading

External links 
    Special lectures commemorating Professor Ramkrishna Mukherjee, 28-29 March 2016
   In Memorium Ramkrishna Mukherjee by TNMadan

1917 births
2015 deaths
Bengali Hindus
Bengali writers
Bengali historians
20th-century Bengalis
Scholars from Kolkata
Indian social sciences writers
20th-century Indian social scientists
University of Calcutta alumni
Indian anthropologists
Indian Marxist historians
Indian sociologists
Indian Marxist writers
People from Baranagar